This is a list of Isma'ili missionaries (da'is).

Background
The simplified description of the hierarchy (hudūd) of the organization of the Ismaili da'wah was as follows:
Nāṭiq, the messenger-propher.
Waṣī, the prophet's "legatee".
Imām. The absolute head of the da'wah organization. All senior appointments had to be approved by him.
Dā'ī ad-Du'āt''' ( literally "Da'i of the Da'is"), "Chief Da'i"; also known as bāb (literally "gateway") in Fatimid sources. The administrative head of the organization.Pīr in Indian subcontinent know to be second to imam and no other position is higher than it other than imam. The appointment has to be done by imam and Pir is appointed usually from the imam's family unless title given after death
Dā'ī kabīr -- "Superior Da'i", "Great Da'i"
Dā'ī (literally "missionary", plural du'āt) -- "Ordinary Da'i", "Da'i". Always acting as group, not singly; except in a very small area.

See List of the Order of Assassins for examples of Nizari Ismaili Missionaries or du'āt and List of Dai of the Dawoodi Bohra or Da'i al-Mutlaq for examples of Tayyibi Isma'ilism Missionaries or du'āt.

List

See also
List of Ismaili imams
List of Dai of Dawoodi Bohra
Alavi Bohras
Atba-i-Malak
Sulaymani
Da'i al-Mutlaq
Dawah

References

Lists of Muslims
Ismaili da'is
 
Missionaries